Xinsheng may refer to:

Babies On Board, a 2018 Singaporean TV series

Towns and townships in China
 Chongqing
Xinsheng, Liangping District (新盛), a town in Liangping District
Xinsheng, Qijiang District (新盛), a town in Qijiang District
Xinsheng, Tongnan District (新胜), a town in Tongnan District
Xinsheng, Zhong County (新生), a town in Zhong County

Heilongjiang 
Xinsheng Township, Baiquan County (新生乡), a township in Baiquan County
Xinsheng Oroqen Ethnic Township (新生鄂伦春族乡), a township in Heihe

Sichuan 
Xinsheng, Deyang (新盛), a town in Deyang
Xinsheng, Santai County (新生), a town in Santai County
Xinsheng Township, Dazhu County (新生乡), a township in Dazhu County
Xinsheng Township, Pengxi County (新胜乡), a township in Pengxi County
Xinsheng Township, Qianwei County (新盛乡), a township in Qianwei County

Subdistricts in China
Xinsheng Subdistrict, Panjin (新生街道), a subdistrict in Xinglongtai District, Panjin, Liaoning
Xinsheng Subdistrict, Yangzhou (新盛街道), a subdistrict in Hanjiang District, Yangzhou, Jiangsu
Xinsheng Subdistrict, Datong (新胜街道), a subdistrict in Yungang District, Datong, Shanxi